Lord Adolphus FitzClarence, GCH, ADC (18 February 1802 – 17 May 1856) was a British naval officer.

Biography

FitzClarence was born at Bushy House, Middlesex, and was an illegitimate child of Prince William, Duke of Clarence and St Andrews (later William IV) and his mistress, Dorothy Jordan. He attended a boarding school in Sunbury-on-Thames before being sent to sea at the age of eleven in 1813, aboard . He subsequently served as a midshipman aboard  based in North America and then later in the Mediterranean Sea.

On the accession of FitzClarence's father as king in 1830, he took command of the Royal Yacht, . His father also granted him and his siblings the rank of a younger son/daughter of a marquess by Royal Warrant of Precedence in 1831, enabling him to prefix Lord before his name and he was knighted the following year. He was also appointed Groom of the Robes in 1830 and a Lord of the Bedchamber in 1833.

On the death of his father and the accession of his cousin Victoria in 1837, FitzClarence retained command of the Royal Yacht (until he was promoted to a rear-admiral in 1853) and his allowance allowed to continue. The queen reported that he "burst into tears, and said it was unexpected, for they [the FitzClarences] did not dare to hope for anything" (as illegitimate children of a former monarch). In 1848, he also became a naval aide-de-camp to the queen and retained the office until he died, unmarried, at Newburgh Priory in 1856.

He was interred in the chancel of St. Michael's Church, Coxwold.

Ancestry

Notes

See also

References

External links
 

1802 births
1856 deaths
Adolphus FitzClarence, Lord
Illegitimate children of William IV of the United Kingdom
Royal Navy officers
Royal Navy rear admirals
Younger sons of marquesses
Sons of kings